Musotima is a genus of moths of the family Crambidae.

Species
Musotima acclaralis (Walker, 1859)
Musotima acrias Meyrick, 1884
Musotima aduncalis (C. Felder, R. Felder & Rogenhofer, 1875)
Musotima decoralis Snellen, 1901
Musotima dryopterisivora Yoshiyasu, 1985
Musotima franckei Caradja, 1927
Musotima incrustalis Snellen, 1895
Musotima instrumentalis Swinhoe, 1894
Musotima kumatai Inoue, 1996
Musotima leucomma (Hampson, 1917)
Musotima nitidalis (Walker, 1866)
Musotima nubilalis South in Leech & South, 1901
Musotima ochropteralis (Guenée, 1854)
Musotima pudica (T. P. Lucas, 1894)
Musotima suffusalis (Hampson, 1893)
Musotima tanzawensis Yoshiyasu, 1985

References

Crambidae genus list at Butterflies and Moths of the World of the Natural History Museum

Musotiminae
Crambidae genera
Taxa named by Edward Meyrick